Leonarda Balog (born 5 February 1993) is a Croatian football defender currently playing for SKN St. Pölten in the Austrian ÖFB-Frauenliga.

Career
Balog played for Plamen Križevci and ŽNK Osijek of the Croatian 1. HNLŽ from 2005 to 2011. While at ŽNK Osijek in 2010, she played her first Champions League match. In 2011, she then joined Unia Racibórz of the Polish Ekstraliga, had a brief spell at German 2. Bundesliga side 1. FFC Recklinghausen in 2013 before returning to Poland later that year to settle at Zagłębie Lubin.

In 2016, she moved to Swiss Nationalliga A side FC Neunkirch

She played for the Croatian national team in the 2011 World Cup qualifying.

References

External links

1993 births
Living people
Croatian women's footballers
Croatia women's international footballers
Expatriate women's footballers in Poland
Expatriate women's footballers in Germany
Expatriate women's footballers in Switzerland
RTP Unia Racibórz players
FC Neunkirch players
Women's association football defenders
SKN St. Pölten players
ÖFB-Frauenliga players
Swiss Women's Super League players
Croatian Women's First Football League players
ŽNK Osijek players
Croatian expatriate women's footballers
Croatian expatriate sportspeople in Germany
Croatian expatriate sportspeople in Austria
Croatian expatriate sportspeople in Switzerland
Croatian expatriate sportspeople in Poland
Expatriate women's footballers in Austria
People from Križevci